The El Tamá National Park It is a protected area with the status of a national park that is located between the Andes and plains of Venezuela.
It protects part of the Tamá Massif.
Created as a National Park on December 12, 1978, by the then President Carlos Andrés Pérez.

The park is located in the páramos of Tamá with an altitude of 3,320 msnm, Cerro El Cobre with 3,613 msnm and "Judío" with 3,372 msnm, occupying the upper parts of the basins of the rivers Carapo, Río Chiquito, Quinimarí, Quite , Burguita, Burgua, Nula, Nulita, Sarare, Cutufí and Oirá, and the basins of the rivers Frio and Negro,  in jurisdiction of the Municipalities Junín, Córdoba and Libertador of the Táchira and Paez of Apure State. Its creation was justified because it constitutes an exceptional natural sanctuary of flora, fauna and scenic beauties and that the area of the upper part of the Carapo, Río Chiquito, Quinimari, Quite, Burguita, Burgua, Nula, Nulita, Sarare, Cutufí and Oirá, as well as the entire area of the Frío and Negro river basins, which represent a valuable system of water protection zones, whose preservation is of public utility for the collective well-being of the Táchira State and the region of The Andes.

See also
List of national parks of Venezuela
Sierra Nevada National Park (Venezuela)

References

National parks of Venezuela
Protected areas established in 1978
1978 establishments in Venezuela
Geography of Táchira
Tourist attractions in Táchira